is a Japanese professional basketball player who plays for the Toshiba Kawasaki Brave Thunders of the B.League in Japan.

Stats

|-
| align="left" | JBL 2012-13
| align="left" | Toshiba
| 10|| || 2.7|| .182|| .000|| .500|| 0.6|| 0.2|| 0|| 0|| 0.5
|-
| align="left" | NBL 2013-14
| align="left" | Toshiba Kanagawa
| 42|| || 9.5|| .400|| .268|| .867|| 0.9|| 0.4|| 0.2|| 0.0|| 2.4
|-
| align="left" | NBL 2014-15
| align="left" | Toshiba Kanagawa
| 42||3 || 13.4|| .448|| .333|| .731|| 1.1|| 0.6|| 0.6|| 0.1|| 3.7
|-
| align="left" | NBL 2015-16
| align="left" | Toshiba Kanagawa
| 49|| 35|| 21.4|| .441|| .370|| .778|| 1.9|| 1.3|| 0.7|| 0.1|| 4.6
|-
| align="left" | B1 2016-17
| align="left" | Kawasaki
| 59||58 || 22.9||.433 ||.418 ||.880 ||1.6 ||1.9 ||0.5 ||0.1 ||5.7 
|-
| align="left" | 2017-18
| align="left" | Kawasaki
| 57||57 || 24.6||.409 ||.401 ||.810 ||1.8 ||2.4 ||0.9 ||0.1 ||5.8 
|-
|}

References

1989 births
Living people
Japanese men's basketball players
People from Hanamaki, Iwate
Sportspeople from Iwate Prefecture
Kawasaki Brave Thunders players
Forwards (basketball)